One Park Avenue was a proposed supertall skyscraper that would have been 550 m (1,804 ft) tall and would have had 125 floors, to be built in Jumeirah Garden City, Dubai. The project was cancelled due to the 2009 financial crisis.

See also
List of tallest buildings in Dubai
Jumeirah Garden City

References

External links
Smithgill.com

Proposed skyscrapers in Dubai